Law firms are a common element of fictional depictions of legal practice. In legal drama, generally, they create opportunities to depict lawyers engaged in dramatic interactions that are reflective of the real-world drama of the profession. The portrayal of law firms varies by the media in which they are presented, with law firms in novels and in films (many of which are simply adaptations of the novels) being presented in a negative light, while law firms in television series tending to be presented more positively.

In books and film
The opposing large law firm is a standard villain in legal thrillers and trial films alike. In 2001, UCLA law professor Michael Asimow wrote:

Because of this perception, law firms are readily represented as places of intrigue and deception, with modern portrayals that "extend from the surreal to the diabolical". Asimow notes that these portrayals have real legal significance because "stories about law, lawyers, or the legal system in film, television, or print" are the vehicle by which "the public learns most of what it thinks it knows about law, lawyers and the legal system".

Although the first film specifically about a law firm, the 1933 film Counsellor at Law, portrays the fictional New York City law firm of Simon & Tedesco as an upstanding practice populated by attorneys who are good-hearted (if occasionally lapsing in their ethical conduct), this type of entity was thereafter typically portrayed on film as a villainous enterprise.

John Grisham, in particular, has displayed a penchant for portraying large firms as evil entities, contrasted against heroic solo practitioners, small firm attorneys, law students, and against their own more ethical young associates.

In television
Fictional law firms that serve as the backdrop for television shows tend to be portrayed in a more sympathetic light. Asimow wrote that it is "striking how much more favorably law firms are portrayed on dramatic television series than in film". This is reflected in the earliest television series depicting a law firm, The Defenders which revolved around the father and son firm of Preston & Preston. Other sympathetic portrayals are found in L.A. Law, Ally McBeal, and The Practice, and Will & Grace (which is not centered on a law firm, but prominently depicts one in several episodes as a title character's place of employment). Each of these shows depict a mid-size firm, rather than an office of a very large firm, and each depicts attorneys employed by the firm as having very different legal specialties and temperaments. These positive portrayals, however, do not extend to larger firms.

Many television programs having law firms at their core have been written or created by David E. Kelley, himself a Boston University School of Law graduate who had worked for a Boston law firm. Kelley was a writer for L.A. Law, and created Ally McBeal, The Practice, and Boston Legal, and also scripted the film, From the Hip, a legal thriller that centered some acerbic attention on the machinations of the lead character's law firm.

List
This list contains notable fictional law firms, being those that exist only as an integral part of a notable work of fiction. They are categorized by the media in which the firm was first introduced.

From books
 Agee, Poe & Epps, New York law firm in The Associate by John Grisham
 Baker Potts, San Francisco law firm in The Associate by John Grisham
 Bendini, Lambert & Locke from The Firm by John Grisham
 Boone & Boone, in Theodore Boone: Kid Lawyer by John Grisham
 Blackwood & Price, in Saving Max by Antoinette van Heugten
 Brim, Stearns, and Kidlow, DC law firm in The Pelican Brief by John Grisham
 The Law Offices of J. Clay Carter II in The King of Torts by John Grisham
 Dennard & McShane, Washington, D.C. law film in The Impeachment of Abraham Lincoln by Steven L. Carter
 Dewey, Cheetham & Howe from J R by William Gaddis
 Dodson & Fogg in Bleak House by Charles Dickens
 Drake & Sweeny from The Street Lawyer by John Grisham
 Durban & Lang, New York firm in John Grisham's short story "Fish Files" 
 Dunn & McCrory, Los Angeles, California law firm from Columbo: The Grassy Knoll by William Harrington
 Findley and Baker, Memphis law firm in The Client by John Grisham
 Finley & Figg, in The Litigators by John Grisham
 The Flak Law Firm, Texas family-run firm in The Confession by John Grisham
 Ganganelli, Pecci, Peretti from A Frolic of His Own by William Gaddis
 Garton, London law firm in The Associate by John Grisham
 Graham Douglas & Wilkins, Toronto law firm in Jeffrey Archer's short story "Christina Rosenthal"
 The Law Offices of Harry Rex Vonner in John Grisham's short story "Fish Files" 
 Haskins, Haskins & Purbright, law firm in Jeffrey Archer's short story "Where There's a Will"
 The Law Offices of Jacob McKinley Stafford, LLC, in John Grisham's short story "Fish Files" 
 The Law Offices of John L. McAvoy in The Associate by John Grisham
 Logan & Kupec, New York law firm in The Associate by John Grisham
 Lomax, Davis and Lomax, firm of solicitors in Jeffrey Archer's short story "The Loophole"
 Michelin Chiz & Associates, Pennsylvania law firm in The Associate by John Grisham 
 Morecombe, Slant and Honeyplace from the Discworld novels by Terry Pratchett
 Myers & O'Malley, "...the oldest law firm in D.C..." in The King of Torts by John Grisham
 Rosato & Associates from various novels by Lisa Scottoline
 Salitieri, Poore, Nash, De Brutus and Short from Gravity's Rainbow by Thomas Pynchon
 Scully & Pershing, New York law firm in The Associate by John Grisham; also in "Camino Island" by John Grisham (Paris branch)
 Slow and Bideawhile, London law firm in The Way We Live Now and other novels by Anthony Trollope
 Sullivan & O'Hare, Clanton firm in A Time to Kill by John Grisham
 Walker-Stearns, New York law firm in The King of Torts by John Grisham
 Warpe, Wistfull, Kubitschek and McMingus from The Crying of Lot 49 by Thomas Pynchon
 White and Blazevich, DC law firm in The Pelican Brief by John Grisham
 Wilbanks & Wilbanks, Clanton firm in A Time to Kill by John Grisham

From films
 Altman, Altman, & Altman from The Angriest Man in Brooklyn
 Arnell, Delano & Strauss from Changing Lanes
 Churchill, Harline & Smith from Enchanted
 Ducksworth, Saver & Gross from The Mighty Ducks
 Hungerdunger, Hungerdunger, Hungerdunger, Hungerdunger & McCormick from Animal Crackers
 Kenner, Bach & Ledeen from Michael Clayton
 Milton, Chadwick & Waters from The Devil's Advocate
 Patton, Shaw & Lord from Absolute Power (1996)
 Sheffield & Associates from Scarface
 Simon & Tedesco from Counsellor at Law
 Webster, Webster & Cohen from Cool Runnings
 Wyant Wheeler Hellerman Tetlow and Brown from Philadelphia

From television shows 
 3 Equity Court, the address of the otherwise unnamed law firm of Rumpole of the Bailey and related books etc.
 Babip, Vorp, Pecota & Eckstein from Parks and Recreation
 Barr, Robinovitch & Tchobanian from Street Legal
 Bass and Marshall from The Associates
 Cage, Fish and Associates from Ally McBeal
 Crane, Constable, McNeil & Montero from Century City
 Crane, Poole & Schmidt from Boston Legal
 Dewey, Cheathem & Livingstone from 30 Rock
 Doucette and Stein from Will & Grace
 Fagen & Harrison from Billable Hours
 Feline Feline & Hairball from MADtv
 Firth, Wynn, & Meyer from The Fresh Prince of Bel-Air (Will Smith humorously compares them to Earth, Wind & Fire in the pilot episode)
 Florrick Agos from The Good Wife
 Franklin and Franklin from Franklin and Bash
 Gage Whitney Pace (aka "Gage Whitney") from the Aaron Sorkin series The West Wing, Studio 60 on the Sunset Strip, as well as the January 12, 2009, episode of 24 and the 2017 film Molly's Game.
 Gosset, Harper & Long from The Good Wife
 Greenberg & Greenberg from Jimmy Kimmel Live!
 Grey & Associates from Kevin Hill
 Gublin & Green from Saturday Night Live
 Hackey, Joake & Dunnit from The Simpsons
 Hamlin, Hamlin & McGill from Better Call Saul
 Hewes and Associates from Damages
 Hoffman and Associates (later "Wyler and Associates") from Murder One
 I Can't Believe It's a Law Firm! - from The Simpsons
 Infeld Daniels from Franklin & Bash
 Jackman, Carter and Clein - Charmed
 Jeryn Hogarth & Associates (previously Hogarth Chao & Benowitz) from Jessica Jones, Daredevil and Iron Fist
 Kingdom & Kingdom (later "Kingdom & Anderson") from Kingdom
 Laura Strike-DePalma & Associates from NCIS
 Levy, Saunderson and Brown from Brookside 
 Litt Wheeler Williams Bennett (originally Gordon Schmidt Van Dyke, later rebranded as Pearson Hardman, Pearson Darby, Pearson Specter, Pearson Specter Litt, Zane Specter Litt, Specter Litt Wheeler Williams then Specter Litt Williams) from Suits
 Lockhart Gardner (previously Stern, Lockhart and Gardner, then Lockhart, Gardner and Bond) from The Good Wife
 Lotus, Spackman & Phelps from Is It Legal?
 Luvem and Burnem Family Law from The Simpsons
 Matlock & Matlock (later "Matlock & Thomas" and then "Matlock & MacIntyre") from Matlock
 McKenzie, Brackman, Cheney, and Kuzak (later "McKenzie, Brackman, Cheney, Kuzak, and Becker", then "McKenzie, Brackman, Cheney, and Becker"; informally "McKenzie Brackman") from L.A. Law
 Morelli & Kaczmarek from The Defenders
 Nelson and Murdock, Attorneys at Law from Daredevil
 Landman & Zack LLP from Daredevil
 Oompa Loompa and Golden from MADtv
 Rabinowitz, Rabinowitz, and Rabinowitz from All in the Family
 Rebecchi-Cammeniti from Neighbours
 Reddick, Boseman, & Kolstad from The Good Fight
 Reed & Reed from Fairly Legal
 Robert Donnell and Associates (later Donnell, Young, Dole and Frutt and then Young, Frutt and Berluti) from The Practice
 Russell & Tate from Saturday Night Live
 Saul Goodman & Associates from Breaking Bad
 Sterling, Huddle, Oppenheim, & Craft - The Deep End
 Stuart, Whitehead and Moore from Neighbours
 Sebben & Sebben from Harvey Birdman, Attorney at Law
 Sagman, Bennett, Robbins, Oppenheim & Taff from Seinfeld
 Tim Collins and Associates from Neighbours
 Vitale, Horowitz, Riordan, Schrecter, Schrecter, and Schrecter - Daria
 Wakefield-Cady from Suits
 Wethersby, Posner, and Klein (later two firms: Wethersby & Stone and Posner & Klein) from Eli Stone
 Whitcomb, Wiley, Hawking, Harrison and Kendall from The West Wing
 Wolfram & Hart from Angel
 Wolfram, Hart and Donowitz from NCIS
 Young and Knott, Legal from The Increasingly Poor Decisions of Todd Margaret

From unknown or miscellaneous sources
 Delio & Furax, from Grand Theft Auto: Vice City, a video game, 
 Dewey, Cheatem & Howe, referred to by the Three Stooges, Groucho Marx, Daffy Duck, Leisure Suit Larry III, Car Talk, and many others
 Flywheel, Shyster, and Flywheel, radio vehicle for the Marx Brothers in the 1930s
 Larsen E. Pettifogger, from the comic strip, The Wizard of Id
 Nelson & Murdock, from Daredevil comic books
 Partnership Collective from the webcomic Schlock Mercenary
 Roper, Bender & Raper, from Frank Zappa's Thing-Fish album
 Sue, Grabbit & Runne, featured regularly in Private Eye magazine
 Sue, Cripple & Sneer, featured in Frontier: Elite 2, a video game
 Wright & Co. (previously Fey & Co.), from Phoenix Wright: Ace Attorney, a video game
 Wolff & Byrd, attorneys of the Macabre from the comic books of the same name
 Themis Law Firm, from the mobile game Tears of Themis
 Baldr Legal Office, from the mobile game Tears of Themis

References